Donald Walker Tunnage (born October 20, 1968) is an American lawyer from Washington, D.C., who serves as an associate judge of the Superior Court of the District of Columbia.

Education 

Tunnage received his Bachelor of Arts, magna cum laude, from Morehouse College in 1990, his Juris Doctor from Duke University Law School in 1992 and his Master of Public Policy from the Harvard Kennedy School in 2000.

Legal career 

From 1993 to 1998, he was assistant public defender in Florida's office of the public defender in Miami. From 2000 to 2009, he was a civil trial attorney in the United States Department of Justice Civil Rights Division. Since 2009, he has been a criminal trial attorney in the same division.

D.C. Superior Court service 

On September 30, 2021, President Joe Biden nominated Tunnage to serve as a judge of the Superior Court of the District of Columbia. President Biden nominated Tunnage to the seat vacated by Judge Russell F. Canan, whose term expired on February 3, 2018. On November 18, 2021, a hearing on his nomination was held before the Senate Homeland Security and Governmental Affairs Committee. The committee reported Tunnage's nomination to the full Senate on December 1, 2021.

On February 2, 2022, the United States Senate invoked cloture on his nomination by a 57–38 vote. On February 7, 2022, his nomination was confirmed by a 54–39 vote. He was sworn in on February 25, 2022.

References

External links 

1968 births
Living people
20th-century American lawyers
21st-century American lawyers
African-American judges
African-American lawyers
Duke University School of Law alumni
Harvard Kennedy School alumni
Judges of the Superior Court of the District of Columbia
Morehouse College alumni
People from Fort Lauderdale, Florida
Public defenders
United States Department of Justice lawyers